Uche Nwaefuna (born 8 May 1994) is a Nigerian actress and model. She is also known as Uche Montana. In 2018, she won the Moreklue All Youth Awards Africa, also known as Maya Awards (Africa), as the best supporting actress in TV series - Hush.

Biography 
Nwaefuna was born on 8 May 1994, in Lagos. She was raised in Lagos, most of her childhood days was with her parents.

Education

Uche Nwaefuna's basic, secondary, and tertiary Education was in Lagos. She attended the Loral International School, Festac, Lagos for her basic while her high school education was at Adeniran Ogunsanya College of Education International School She completed her tertiary education with a diploma in law.

Career

Nwaefuna's rise to spotlight as an actress began in the Nigerian film industry in 2015 when she made her debut as a housemaid in the movie Poison Ivy. She also appeared in the Television drama series Hush which was aired on African Magic Showcase and African Magic Family on GOtv Africa from 2016 – 2017. Afterwards, she has featured in the lead and supporting roles in several Nollywood movies, amongst which are The Fake Life of Abuja Housewives alongside Fredrick Leonard, Nancy Isime, and other actors. She featured with Uzor Arukwe, Belinda Effah, Alex Ekubo, amongst others in Hire a Woman.

Filmography

Accolades

References

External links 

@uchemontana

Nigerian film actresses
Living people
1994 births
Adeniran Ogunsanya College of Education alumni
Igbo actresses
Nigerian television actresses